Broad Creek is a water body bordering the community of Broad Creek, North Carolina.  The creek empties into Bogue Sound, which is separated from the Atlantic Ocean by Bogue Banks, part of North Carolina's barrier islands known as the Southern Outer Banks. The creek also runs through the Croatan National Forest.

See also
Broad Creek, North Carolina

References

Rivers of North Carolina
Rivers of Carteret County, North Carolina
Tributaries of the White Oak River